Raphinha (Raphael Dias Belloli; born 1996) is a Brazilian football winger.

Raphinha may also refer to:

 Raphinha (footballer, born 1993) (Raphael David Thomaz), Brazilian football defender

See also
 Rafinha, the diminutive form of the given name Rafael